Kai Mayfair is a fine dining Chinese restaurant located on 65 South Audley Street, Mayfair, near Park Lane in London, England. It was opened in 1993 by Malaysian sport shooter; Bernard Yeoh, with the intent of changing the perception of the Chinese restaurant experience. Yeoh was keen to show that Asian food has just as much standing in the fine-dining circuit as other cuisines. The head chef is Alex Chow, also a Malaysian, whilst Yeoh continues to be the proprietor to this day.

In 2009, Kai Mayfair was awarded a Michelin Star, making it the only Chinese restaurant added to the 2009 Michelin List in the UK. It was also the first Chinese restaurant in London to be awarded a Michelin star, which the restaurant has retained ever since. Among its other awards include the Harden's Guide's award for Best Chinese Restaurant in London (2009 Edition) and the Zagat Survey'''s Best Chinese Restaurant in London for two years from 2003 - 2005. The restaurant also received nominations for Restaurant magazine's UK Best Dishes as well as Tatler'' magazine's Best Kitchen Awards in 2006.

The cuisine style has been described as 'Modern Chinese', which "mixes tradition with innovation", with the restaurant serving 'Liberated' Chinese cooking from the Nanyang region. The menu includes traditional, familiar dishes like prawn toast and sweet & sour pork but there are also many unfamiliar dishes like Nanyang chilli lobster and spring chicken & Sichuan spicy crumble, which is where the restaurant's "true culinary personality can be found", according to Yeoh's message at the start of the menu. The restaurant also offers an afternoon tea, available from 15:00 - 16:30 pm Wednesday to Sunday.

Kai Mayfair was dubbed "home of the world's most expensive soup" when it unveiled its £108 version of Buddha Jumps Over the Wall in 2005. The dish includes shark's fin, Japanese flower mushroom, sea cucumber, dried scallops, chicken, Hunan ham, pork, and ginseng.

See also
 List of Chinese restaurants
 List of restaurants in London

Notes

External links
 

1993 establishments in England
Chinese restaurants in London
Mayfair
Restaurants established in 1993